The Weather is the seventh studio album by Australian psychedelic rock band Pond. It was released on 5 May 2017 by Marathon Artists. As with previous Pond albums, it is also produced by former member and Tame Impala frontman Kevin Parker. It features 10 tracks, led by its first single "Sweep Me Off My Feet".

Background 
Pond frontman Nicholas Allbrook has described the album as a "concept album, not completely about Perth, but focusing on all the weird contradictory things that make up a lot of colonial cities around the world. Laying out all the dark things underneath the shimmering exterior of cranes, development, money and white privilege. It’s not our place, but it is our place. British, but Australian, but not REAL Australian. On the edge of the world with a hell of a lot of fucked things defining our little city, still we try and live a wholesome respectful life, while being inherently disrespectful. At the end of all this confusion in our weird little white antipodean world, there’s the beach, purity and nature that brings us all together".

The album cover shows a photograph of the Carillon City mall in Hay Street, Perth, taken in the early 1980s (Google Street View).

Critical reception 

The Weather received positive reviews from music critics, holding an average critic score of 80, based on 16 reviews, indicating "generally favorable reviews". Saby Reyes-Kulkarni of Pitchfork wrote that "For all its disjointedness, the album never wanders more than a few inches away from the sublime. It’s a document of a band knocking loudly on the door of greatness." Marcy Donelson for Allmusic described the album as "trippy and shambolic". Donelson also praised its "epic, sometimes otherworldly luster". Gwilym Mumford in The Guardian wrote that the album is "Accessible but still absolutely out there, this is prog, but not as we know it."

Track listing

Personnel 
Pond
 Nicholas Allbrook
 Jay Watson
 Joe Ryan
 Jamie Terry

Additional musicians
 Christian Ruggiero – horns on "30000 Megatons" and "Zen Automaton", saxophone on "Colder Than Ice"
 Jamie Canny, Sam Newman – horns on "30000 Megatons" and "Zen Automaton"
 Mei Saraswåati – additional vocals on "Sweep Me Off My Feet" and "Colder Than Ice"
 James SK Wān – bamboo flute on "Colder Than Ice"
 Kirin J Callinan – additional vocals on "Paint Me Silver" and "Colder Than Ice", guitar noises on "Edge of the World, Pt. 2"
 James Ireland – piano and some production on "A/B"

Production
 Production – Kevin Parker and Pond
 Engineering – Pond, Kevin Parker, Richard Ingham
 Mastering – Greg Calbi
 Packaging design – Alex Joseph

Charts

References 

Pond (Australian band) albums
2017 albums
Albums produced by Kevin Parker
Marathon Artists albums